Farajabad and Farjabad may refer to:

 Farajabad, Ardabil
 Farajabad, Isfahan
 Farajabad, Gotvand, Khuzestan Province
 Farajabad, Lali, Khuzestan Province
 Farajabad, Kurdistan
 Farajabad, Khomeyn, Markazi Province
 Farajabad, Zarandieh, Markazi Province
 Farajabad, Chalus, Mazandaran Province
 Farajabad, Juybar, Mazandaran Province
 Farajabad, Qom